Leopoldo Cano y Masas (13 November 1844 – 1934) was a Spanish soldier, poet and playwright associated with the Realist movement.

1844 births
1934 deaths
Members of the Royal Spanish Academy
Spanish dramatists and playwrights
Spanish male dramatists and playwrights
Spanish generals
Spanish male poets
19th-century Spanish military personnel